The following is a timeline of the history of the city of Luanda, Angola.

16th–18th centuries

 1530s – "Portuguese establish a slave-trading station."
 1575 – Church built on Ilha de Luanda.
 1576
 São Paulo da Assumpção de Loanda founded by Portuguese Paulo Dias de Novais.
 Fortress of São Miguel built.
 1605 – Settlement recognized as a city.
 1618 – Fortaleza São Pedro da Barra built.
 1623 – Jesuit college founded.
 1634 – Fortress of São Miguel rebuilt.
 1641 – Capture of Luanda by Dutch.
 1648 – Returned to being a Portuguese possession.
 1679 – Cathedral of Luanda built.
 1684 – Bishop's seat relocated to Luanda from São Salvador.
 1764 – Arquivo Historico de Angola organized.
 1766 – Fortress of São Francisco do Penedo rebuilt.
 1769 – Aula de Geometria e Fortificacao (educational institution) founded.
 1781 – Population: 9,755.
 1796 – Population: 7,204.

19th century
 1816 – Population: 4,689.
 1836 – Slave trade declared illegal.
 1844
 Port opens to foreign shipping.
 Population: 5,605.
 1850 – Population: 12,565.
 1865 – Banco Nacional Ultramarino branch opens.
 1873 – Biblioteca Municipal established.
 1881 – O Echo de Angola begins publication.
 1889 – Luanda Railway and aqueduct begin operating.
 1896 – Palácio de Ferro (iron palace) assembled.

20th century

 1908 – Voz de Angola newspaper begins publication.
 1910 – Population: 15,000 (approximate).
 1913 – Angolan League founded in Luanda.
 1923 – A Provincia de Angola newspaper begins publication.
 1930 – Diario de Luanda newspaper begins publication.
 1940
 Roman Catholic Archdiocese of Luanda established.
 Population: 61,028.
 1942 – Liceu Salvador Correia de Sa (school) built.
 1950 – Population: 141,647.
 1951 – Mensagem literary magazine begins publication.
 1954 – General Craveiro Lopes Airport inaugurated.
 1956
 Museu Nacional de História Natural de Angola (Natural History Museum of Angola) built.
 People's Movement for the Liberation of Angola headquartered in Luanda.
 1958 – Petroleum refinery built by Fina Petroleos de Angola.
 1960 – Population: 224,540.
 1962 – Estudos Gerais Universitários de Angola founded.
 1964 –  (cinema) built.
 1969 – National Library of Angola founded.
 1970 – Population: 475,328 urban agglomeration.
 1975
 June: Angolan Civil War begins.
 11 November: City becomes part of independent Republic of Angola.
 União dos Escritores Angolano (writer's union) established.
 Televisao Publica de Angola headquartered in city.
 1976
 Museu Nacional de Antropologia (National Anthropology Museum) and Grupo Desportivo Interclube football club founded.
 National Bank of Angola headquartered in city.
 1978 – Angola Red Cross and Cinemateca Nacional de Angola headquartered in city.
 1979
 University of Angola established.
 17 September: Funeral of Agostinho Neto.
 1980 – Empresa de Electricidade de Luanda (electricity company), Atlético Petróleos de Luanda football club, and National Centre for Historical Documentation and Research established.
 1981 – August–September: Central African Games held in city.
 1985 – City joins the newly formed .
 1988 – Elinga Theater established.
 1989 – October: International Países Africanos de Língua Oficial Portuguesa meets in Luanda.
 1991 – October: UNITA headquarters relocated to Luanda from Jamba.
 1992
 Luanda Antena Comercial (radio) begins broadcasting.
 30 October-1 November: Three Day War.
 1993 – Population: 1,822,407 (urban agglomeration).
 1997
 Jornal do Rangel newspaper begins publication.
 National Museum of Slavery founded.
 1999
 Catholic University of Angola and Cha de Caxinde publishing firm founded.
 January: UNITA-R congress held in city.
 2000 – Population: 2,591,000 (urban agglomeration).

21st century

 2001 – Boa Vista shantytown residents evicted.
 2003 – Estádio Joaquim Dinis built.
 2005 – Population: 3,533,000 (urban agglomeration).
 2006 – African Diamond Producers Association headquartered in city.
 2007
 Feira Internacional de Luanda (international fair) established.
 January: Flooding.
 Edificio GES, Edificio Sonangol, and Torres Atlantico towers built.
 2008 – Construction of Angola International Airport begins.
 2009
 Estádio 11 de Novembro opens.
 Luanda International Jazz Festival begins.
 March: Catholic pope visits city; stampede at Estádio dos Coqueiros.
 Francisca Espírito Santo becomes governor of Luanda Province (approximate date).
 2010
 Luanda Railway resumes operating.
 Edificio Zimbo Tower built.
 2011
 Intercontinental Hotel built.
 Jose Maria dos Santos becomes governor of Luanda Province (approximate date).
 Population: 5,068,000.
 2012
 Angola Sovereign Wealth Fund headquartered in city.
 Political protest.
 Kilamba housing development built near city.
 2013 – 1 January: Stampede at Estádio da Cidadela.
 2014 – Graciano Francisco Domingos becomes governor of Luanda Province (approximate date).
 2018 – Population: 2,487,444 (estimate, urban agglomeration).
 2021 – Lusophony Games to be held in Luanda.

See also
 Luanda history
 History of Luanda (in Portuguese)
 List of newspapers in Luanda
 List of colonial governors of Angola, headquartered in Luanda (until 1975)
 Timeline of Benguela

References

This article incorporates information from the Portuguese Wikipedia.

Bibliography

Published in 19th century

Published in 20th century
 
 
 
 
  (Includes Luanda)

Published in 21st century
2000s
 
 
 
 
 
 
 
  (review in H-Luso-Africa)
 
 

2010s
 
 
 
 
  (Includes articles about Luanda)

External links

  (Bibliography of open access articles)
  (Images, etc.)
  (Images, etc.)
  (Bibliography)
  (Bibliography)
  (Bibliography)
 
 

 
Luanda Province
Luanda
Years in Angola
Luanda
Luanda